WXGM is an oldies-formatted broadcast radio station licensed to Gloucester, Virginia, serving Gloucester and Gloucester County, Virginia.  WXGM is owned and operated by WXGM, Inc.

History

WDDY
WDDY went on the air on January 20, 1957, becoming the first radio station in the Middle Peninsula. The station was owned by S. L. Goodman, the owner of a publishing firm in Richmond, though the station was almost immediately sold to WDDY, Inc.—owned by station manager Charles E. Springer—upon signing on the air. It broadcast during the daytime only with 1,000 watts. In 1958, Arthur Lazarow, a former announcer at WWJ radio in Detroit, acquired WDDY in 1958 by way of his company Cape Radio; minority investors in Cape included John R. Daniels and Arthur Shimmin. The station's full-service format included 12 hours a week each of African American and country programming in 1967.

Lazarow owned WDDY for 23 years until he sold it in 1981 for $90,000 to a new WDDY, Inc., owned by William Eure and Thomas Robinson of Petersburg, where they owned WSSV AM and WPLZ-FM. Despite not planning many changes at the outset, changes did come to WDDY: that summer, it relaunched with a country format and picked up coverage of Virginia Cavaliers football and the Washington Redskins. Eure and Robinson laid the groundwork for another change in the 80s by announcing their intention in 1984 to apply for an FM frequency.

WXGM
Comprehensive changes came to 1420 AM on September 1, 1988 when the station was relaunched as WXGM with an oldies format. The overhaul also included $40,000 in equipment upgrades. Even more changes came on July 29, 1991, when WXGM-FM 99.1 launched; the FM and AM stations initially simulcast as adult contemporary "Xtra 99.1 FM". That same year, the AM station reduced its daytime power to 740 watts. Its sports coverage gained a regional appeal the next year when the station began what would be a 9-year relationship with the William & Mary Tribe; WXGM ended the deal abruptly in 2001 when it signed a more favorable deal to carry the athletic events of Christopher Newport University, in which CNU paid the station and offered to help sell advertising.

Robinson later sold a stake in WXGM-AM-FM to Walt Wurfel, who had previously headed the communications department of the National Association of Broadcasters for a decade; Wurfel died in 2018.

See also
WDDY AM, Gloucester, Virginia, tribute site

References

External links

XGM (AM)
Oldies radio stations in the United States
Radio stations established in 1957
1957 establishments in Virginia